The Saint Silvester Road Race is a long-distance running event, the oldest and most prestigious street race in Brazil.

Regarded as the main international event in Latin American athletics, the Brazilian competition is held yearly in the city of São Paulo on December 31.  This day is Saint Silvester's Day, as it is the day in which the Catholic saint, who was a Pope, died in the 4th century of the Christian Era.

São Paulo's race was originally known as a "marathon", although the course of the race, whose length has varied considerably over the years, was never that of a full marathon. Because of that, the organization eventually dropped the term "marathon", starting to refer to the event as a "race", "international race" or "road race". There was never an official effort on the part of the organization to address the change in the nomenclature, which causes many, including some media outlets, to continue using the term "Saint Silvester Marathon" when referring to the event.

Several other places like Amadora, Porto and Volta à cidade do Funchal in Portugal (Corrida de São Silvestre), Calderara di Reno (Maratona di San Silvestro) and Bolzano (BOclassic) in Italy, and Madrid in Spain (San Silvestre Vallecana), organize yearly Saint Silvester road races or marathons every late December.

History
Cásper Líbero, a "media millionaire" of the early 20th century Brazil, is credited with originally coming up with the idea for the race.  He used it as a means of promoting his newspaper.  In 1928, the year of the race's 4th edition, he founded one of the first sports newspapers of the country,  the Gazeta Esportiva (the Sportive Gazette), which then became the race's official organizer and sponsor.  The race would be the main advertising element of this sports newspaper.

The race was held for the first time on 31 December 1925 and hadn't been interrupted or suspended even once until 2020, not even for the duration of World War II.

Originally, it was intended for men only, and participation was restricted to citizens of the city of São Paulo.  In the following years, runners from other parts of the country joined the race, but it was not until 1941 that a runner not from the city of São Paulo won the race: José Tibúrcio dos Santos, of Minas Gerais, another Brazilian state. At that time, the event was not yet open to foreign participation.  That meant that athletes from other countries could not come in to participate, but foreigners residing in the city of São Paulo (immigrants) were free to enroll. Because of this, Italian Heitor Blasi was the only foreigner to have won the race before 1947.

In 1945 the field was opened so that foreign runners could participate.  The first international race was restricted to invited runners from South America, but the success of the first two "international events" led race organizers to open the event to the rest of the world in 1947.  That year marked the beginning of a 34-year-long period during which no Brazilian man won the event, until José João da Silva, from Pernambuco, won in 1980 (he would repeat the feat in 1985).

The event would remain a men-only affair until 1975, when the United Nations declared that year as the International Year of Women.  In commemoration of this, the race organizers held the women's race for the first time.  The women's race started as an open event, and the first Brazilian victory would come only in its 20th edition (in 1995), when Carmem Oliveira won.

Starting December 31, 1982, Rede Globo began to telecast the road race via satellite to the whole of Brazil, in partnership with TV Gazeta.

Since 1993, a shorter race for children is held a few days before the main event (dubbed "São Silvestrinha", or "Little Saint Silvester" – a unisex event).

Until 1988, the race took place at the late night hour starting at 23:00, approaching the New Year's, but the year of 1989 - the year the race began to be recognized as an international running event - saw substantial changes in the race's format, in order to comply with the rules of the IAAF.  The time of the race was altered for first afternoon (to 3:00 p.m. for women and 5:00 p.m. for men), the course direction was reversed, and men and women, who used to run together, had their races separated.  In 1991, the length of the race was extended to 15,000 meters (the distance for the event used to vary almost yearly, usually between 6.5 km and 8.8 km). This variance needed to be corrected in order to meet IAAF marathon and road race regulations and requirements.

The 2020 race was postponed to July 2021 and later cancelled due to the COVID-19 pandemic in Brazil, mark the first time that the race was not held since the debut in 1925.

Growth and prestige

For the first race, in 1925, 60 people filled applications to participate, but only 48 actually showed up on the day of the race.  Of these, only 37 were officially qualified, since the rules then required that all runners had to finish within 3 minutes of the winner in order to qualify in the final board.

In 2004, 13,000 men and 2,000 women participated in their respective events.

Although the event had been open since 1945, it would become a noteworthy affair in the international calendar only in 1953, when the most famous runner of the time (and arguably of all time), Emil Zátopek, participated and won the race.  In recent times, the foremost long distance runners of the last two decades (almost all of them, with the exception of Haile Gebrselassie of Ethiopia) have participated at least once in the event.

The principal winner of all times is now Paul Tergat, of Kenya, who has won the race 5 times (1995, 1996, 1998, 1999 and 2000). The record time for the present distance of 15 km is for his compatriot Kibiwott Kandie with a time of 42 minutes and 59 seconds in the 2019 edition.

Champions

Titles by country

1 Brazilians won 18 times in the national era, and 11 times in the international era. 
2 Italy only won in the national era, with the Italo-Brazilian, Heitor Blasi.

See also
 São Silvestre (film)

References

External links
 Official website 

15K runs
International sports competitions in São Paulo
Recurring sporting events established in 1925
New Year celebrations
December sporting events
1925 establishments in Brazil
Tourist attractions in São Paulo